Jaymie Haycocks (born 12 November 1983 in Shrewsbury) is a professional squash player who represents England. He reached a career-high world ranking of World No. 50 in May 2014. He studied at Bridgnorth Endowed School and then Sport, Physical
Education and Community Studies at Birmingham University.

References

External links 
 
 
 

English male squash players
Living people
1983 births
Alumni of the University of Birmingham